Cnidoscolus texanus, commonly known as Texas bullnettle (also Texas bull nettle and Texas bull-nettle), tread-softly, mala mujer, and finger rot, is a perennial herb covered with stinging hairs. The main stem, branches, leaves, and seed pods are all covered with hispid or glass-like bristly hairs that release an allergenic toxin upon contact. Contact with the plant results in intense pain: stinging, burning, and itching lasting for hours. It is native to the U.S. states of Texas, Arkansas, Kansas, Louisiana, and Oklahoma and also native to the northeastern state of Tamaulipas, Mexico. Texas bullnettle (Cnidoscolus texanus) has showy, fragrant white flowers that can bloom throughout the year in southern regions of its distribution, predominantly March to November in northern regions. It is a drought-tolerant plant, therefore making it a superb choice for xeriscaping. This plant is attractive to birds, bees, butterflies, and other insects. The seeds are known to be consumed by Rio Grande wild turkeys (Meleagris gallopavo intermedia) and mourning doves (Zenaida macroura).

The seeds, which are edible when ripe, are also consumed by humans.  Native Americans harvested bullnettle seeds in the past and some people still eat them today. Each seed pod contains three seeds, which are smooth, somewhat cylindrical, brownish white, and a half to three quarters of an inch long. When ripe, they are dispersed when the pod burst open, catapulting the seeds away from the plant. Great care and caution is advised in collecting the seeds. Tull suggested wearing long pants, long sleeves, boots, and gloves to pick the seed pods with a pair of tongs, then dropping them into a paper sack and waiting for the pods to ripen and burst in the sack to collect the seeds. They are said to be appetizing and tasty with a nutty flavor.

Description

It is a perennial plant with erect or sprawling branching stems growing from thick root stock , up to 40 inches long and 8 inches thick. It has milky latex and stiff prickly glandular-based, stinging hairs. The stems and leaves are green. The leaves are three to six inches, simple, and are alternately arranged on the stem, and each leaf is deeply cut with 3 to 5 lobes. The lobes are typically roughly and irregularly toothed or lobed again. The flowers are in a few flowered terminal cymose inflorescences about one inch across. Flowers have five sepals and lack petals, the sepals are lobed, white, fragrant, and covered with hispid hairs. Each flower has 10 connate stamens. The male and female flowers separate but within the same cluster. The fruits are in prickly 3-seeded capsules.

It was first described by Johannes Müller Argoviensis in 1865 as Jatropha texana. It was then moved to the genus Cnidoscolus in 1903 by John Kunkel Small.

Bullnettle exposure

Contact with the plant, even the inadvertent, gentle brushing of exposed skin in passing, results in intense pain, including a burning, stinging, itching rash lasting for hours, with the fine hairs breaking off in the skin secreting caustic irritants. The spines providing a vehicle for the plants secretions to make it into the dermal and epidermal layers of the skin. In a few extreme cases, people experience a severe reaction that may require treatment, ranging from cellulitis (a type of skin infection) to rare allergic reactions. Some authors suggest relief from a normal reaction can be found with the application of a weak solution of ammonia, "Windex is a good choice" or when in remote areas that urine can be applied, stating "desperate times call for desperate measures".

The secretions of the plant cause an intense burning sensation due to their highly acidic pH. Once the nettles themselves are removed from the skin, a moderately basic preparation such as baking soda mixed with water to form a paste is sufficient to neutralize the acidic secretions of the plant, thus stopping the painful burning and itching sensation. The spines can be removed with an adhesive tape, however, one website suggest waiting 10–15 minutes for the spines to dry, otherwise the pressure from applying the tape will only press more toxins into the skin.

References

texanus
Flora of Arkansas
Flora of Kansas
Flora of Louisiana
Flora of Oklahoma
Flora of Tamaulipas
Flora of Texas
Plants described in 1865
Taxa named by John Kunkel Small
Flora without expected TNC conservation status